The Russian consorts were the spouses of the Russian rulers. They used the titles Princess, Grand Princess, Tsarina or Empress.

Princess of Rus'

Princess of Novgorod

House of Rurik (862–882)

Grand Princess of Kiev

House of Rurik (882–1169)

Grand Princess of Vladimir

House of Rurik (1157–1331)

Grand Princess of Moscow

House of Rurik (1283–1547)

Tsarina of Russia

House of Rurik (1547–1598)

Time of Troubles (1598–1613)

House of Romanov (1613–1721)

Empress of Russia

House of Romanov (1721–1762)

House of Holstein-Gottorp-Romanov (1762–1917)

Notes

Sources
Rulers of Russia

 

Russian
Russian
Royal consorts